UFR may refer to :
 Under Frequency Relay, a type of protective relay used to trip an electrical line when its operating frequency drops below a certain threshold.
 Unité de formation et de recherche (Unit of Formation and Research), a faculty in French universities and some others (University of Ouagadougou)
 Union des Forces pour le Renouveau (Union of the Renewal Forces), a political party in Burkina Faso
 Ultimate Fighting Revolution, a Martial arts tournament
 Union of Resistance Forces, rebel group in Chad
 Ultra Fast Rendering, a printer language
 Université de Franche-Comté, a University in eastern France

See also
 UFRaw, an application which can read and manipulate photographs in raw image formats